Edgars Kļaviņš (born March 3, 1993) is a Latvian professional ice hockey right winger, currently playing for Venta 2002 in the Latvian 1. League.

Career statistics

Regular season and playoffs

References

External links

1993 births
Living people
People from Talsi
Latvian ice hockey right wingers
AIK IF players
Beibarys Atyrau players
IF Troja/Ljungby players
Orlik Opole players
Timrå IK players
TMH Polonia Bytom players